Neoceratitis asiatica is a species of tephritid or fruit flies in the genus Neoceratitis of the family Tephritidae.

References

Dacinae
Diptera of Asia